Pisansin Za-in  (born 3 November 1983) is a Thai professional footballer. He previously played for Navy, having also played for Samut Songkhram. On 17 October 2015, Za-in scored a hat trick in a shocking 4-2 win over Suphanburi.

References

1983 births
Living people
Pisansin Za-in
Pisansin Za-in
Pisansin Za-in
Pisansin Za-in
Association football forwards